Norwood Mound, also known as “Indian Mound” by locals, is a prehistoric Native American earthwork mound located in Norwood, Ohio, United States, an enclave city of Cincinnati in Hamilton County, Ohio. It was listed on the National Register of Historic Places on May 2, 1974.

Description 
It is originally believed to have been taller. The size, shape, and location of the mound suggest it was constructed by people of the Adena culture during the Pre-Columbian era. Archaeologists believe the mound was used by the Adenas for religious ceremonies and smoke signaling. An 1895 source describes it as "the only Indian mound now remaining in the vicinity of Cincinnati." There were mounds in Downtown Cincinnati at the time of arrival of the first white settlers.

Recent history 
There is no evidence that the site has ever been excavated or otherwise destroyed. It is reported that many relics were found in the area by early Norwood settlers in the late 1800s, and these artifacts were the original nucleus of the Native American Art Collection of the Cincinnati Art Museum.

The Norwood Heights neighborhood surrounding the mound was constructed in 1869, when it was reported that seventeen villages and towns could be seen from the summit. The site was deeded to the Village of Norwood in 1875 by Norwood settler, S. H. Parvin, prior to the incorporation of the village.

See also 
List of burial mounds in the United States
Mound builder (people)
Serpent Mound
Monks Mound
Norwood, Ohio

Notes 

Norwood, Ohio
Archaeological sites in Ohio
Archaeological sites on the National Register of Historic Places in Ohio
Archaeological sites in Hamilton County, Ohio
National Register of Historic Places in Hamilton County, Ohio
Mounds in Ohio